Dennis Hale may refer to:

 Dennis Hale (political scientist), associate professor of political science at Boston College
 Dennis Hale (rugby league), New Zealand former international rugby league referee
 Dennis Hale (vocalist) (1922–1960), English vocalist
 Dennis Hale (1940–2015), the sole survivor of the sinking of the SS Daniel J. Morrell